Lewis Brook is a tributary of the Stony Brook in Mercer County, New Jersey in the United States.

Course

Sister tributaries
Baldwins Creek
Duck Pond Run
Honey Branch
Peters Brook
Stony Brook Branch
Woodsville Brook

See also
List of rivers of New Jersey

References

External links
USGS Coordinates in Google Maps

Rivers of Mercer County, New Jersey
Tributaries of the Raritan River
Rivers of New Jersey